Zeyarat-e Pain (also Romanized as Zeyārat-e Pā’īn) is a village in Jamabrud Rural District, in the Central District of Damavand County, Tehran Province, Iran. At the 2006 census, its population was 20, in 8 families.

References 

Populated places in Damavand County